El vals del obrero is an album by the Spanish ska punk band Ska-P, released on 21 March 1996.

The album title means "The Worker's Waltz". The album cover depicts a typical Spanish "cacique", as a symbol of capitalism, amongst other things, fat cigar in one hand and manipulating a string puppet, dressed as a worker, with the other. The breast pocket of his jacket is stuffed with banknotes. He's also wearing ostentatious gold rings, cuff-links and a gold tie pin with the eagle which symbolised Francoist Spain.

Track list

Certifications

Personnel 
 Pulpul – vocals, guitar
 F. J. Navío – drums
 Julio – bass
 Joxemi – guitar
 Alberto J. Amado – keyboard
 Pipi – backing vocals

References

External links 
 Ska-P's official website
 

1996 albums
Ska-P albums